Chusquea maclurei is a species of grass in the family Poaceae. It is found only in Ecuador.

References

maclurei
Endemic flora of Ecuador
Grasses of South America
Vulnerable flora of South America
Taxonomy articles created by Polbot